The 2010 Mumbai oil spill occurred after the Panama-flagged MV MSC Chitra (IMO: 7814838) and  (IMO: 8128690) collided off the coast of India near Mumbai on Saturday, 7 August 2010 at around 9:50am local time. MSC Chitra, which was outbound from South Mumbai's Nava Sheva port, collided with the inbound Khalijia-III, which caused about 200 cargo containers from MSC Chitra to be thrown into the Arabian Sea. Khalijia-III was apparently involved with another mishap on 18 July 2010.

See also
List of oil spills

References

Oil spills in India
Mumbai Oil Spill, 2010
Mumbai Oil Spill, 2010
2010 in the environment
History of Mumbai (1947–present)
2010s in Mumbai
Disasters in Maharashtra
Environment of Maharashtra